Parachrostia owadai is a moth of the family Erebidae first described by Shigero Sugi in 1982. It is known from Okinawa, Tokunoshima and Iheyajima, islands southwest of Japan.

Adults have been found in May, September, October, and November, but probably occur in numerous generations.

The wingspan is 11–13 mm. The forewing is relatively narrow, with a bright, ovoid, yellow reniform stigma. The crosslines are all present, black and waved. The terminal line is marked by tight black interveinal spots. The hindwing is grey, with an indistinct discal spot. The underside of the forewing is brownish grey, without a pattern. The underside of the hindwing is light grey, with a discal spot.

References

Micronoctuini
Moths of Japan
Moths described in 1982